Harald Olof "Olle" Ingemar Nygren (11 November 1929 – 13 February 2021) was a Swedish motorcycle speedway rider, who reached the finals of the Speedway World Championship five times. Nygren was Swedish Champion in 1949 and became Nordic Champion in 1960. After retirement, Nygren set up a successful speedway training school.

Nygren lived in England from the 1960s. He died in Ipswich at the age of 91, after contracting COVID-19; he had previously been treated for laryngeal cancer.

World Final appearances

Individual World Championship
 1953 –  London, Wembley Stadium – 4th - 12+2pts
 1954 –  London, Wembley Stadium – 3rd - 13+2pts
 1955 –  London, Wembley Stadium – 8th - 9pts
 1958 –  London, Wembley Stadium – 7th - 9pts
 1959 –  London, Wembley Stadium – 4th - 11+2pts

World Team Cup
 1960 -  Göteborg, Ullevi (with Ove Fundin / Rune Sörmander / Björn Knutsson) - Winner - 44pts (12)
 1968 -  London, Wembley Stadium (with Bengt Jansson / Anders Michanek / Ove Fundin / Torbjörn Harrysson) - 2nd - 30pts (3)

World Longtrack Championship
 1957 - Semi-final
 1958 -  Muhldorf (14th)
 1959 -  Helsinki (Third)
 1960 -  Plattling (9th)
 1961 -  Oslo (Second)
 1978 - Qualifying Round
 1979 - Qualifying Round

Formula One
In 1962, Nygren took part in a minor Formula One race, the Kanonloppet, at the Karlskoga Circuit at Karlskoga in his home country of Sweden. He drove a Lotus 18 loaned to him by American driver Jay Chamberlain. Nygren qualified tenth of the ten starters, and had to retire after just six laps with a gearbox failure.

Non-Championship Formula One results
(key)

References

External links

 Profile at Grasstrack GB

1929 births
2021 deaths
Sportspeople from Stockholm
Deaths from the COVID-19 pandemic in England
Swedish speedway riders
Harringay Racers riders
Norwich Stars riders
Swindon Robins riders
Wimbledon Dons riders
West Ham Hammers riders
Ipswich Witches riders
Coventry Bees riders
King's Lynn Stars riders
Bristol Bulldogs riders
Southampton Saints riders
New Cross Rangers riders
125cc World Championship riders
Individual Speedway Long Track World Championship riders
Swedish emigrants to the United Kingdom